Eugene Cyril "Geno" Smith III (born October 10, 1990) is an American football quarterback for the Seattle Seahawks of the National Football League (NFL). He played college football at West Virginia, leading the Mountaineers to multiple bowl games, breaking numerous passing records, and garnering multiple awards before getting drafted by the New York Jets in the second round of the 2013 NFL Draft.

After two inconsistent seasons as the Jets' starting quarterback, Smith eventually lost his starting position due to injuries in his final two years with the team. He then spent time as a backup for the New York Giants and Los Angeles Chargers before unexpectedly making a career resurgence as the Seattle Seahawks' starting quarterback in 2022, earning his first Pro Bowl selection, having his first winning record and playoff berth as a starter, leading the league in completion percentage, and ultimately winning the Comeback Player of the Year award.

Early years 
Smith was born to Eugene Smith Jr. and Tracy Seller in Miramar, Florida on October 10, 1990. His great-uncle, Danny Smith, was a record breaking All-American hurdler at Florida State, and his cousin Melvin Bratton was a star running back at Miami in the mid-1980s. His nickname, Geno, came from his grandfather, who was nicknamed "Big Geno".

Smith was admitted to Norland Middle School's magnet program, which dedicated two hours per day to arts instruction. He went on to attend Miramar High School where he was coached by former Mountaineer Damon Cogdell. As a junior, he passed for 2,200 yards, 25 touchdowns, and three interceptions, and was named second-team all-state quarterback. He was also named second-team all-Broward County as an athlete for 2007. Following his junior year he was invited to the prestigious Elite 11 quarterback camp in Aliso Viejo, California.

During Smith's senior season, he led his team to the state 6A semi-finals and completed 205 of 338 passes for 3,089 yards and 30 touchdowns while also rushing for over 300 yards. He was a first-team all-state selection in Florida Class 6A and a Parade All-American. He was also the No. 1 rated player in Broward County according to the Miami Herald and South Florida Sun Sentinel, and finished No. 2 in the voting for Mr. Florida. He finished his career as the third-best passer in Broward County history, and was named to the ESPN Top 150 prospects list. He chose to attend West Virginia over offers from Florida State, South Florida, Boston College, and Alabama.

College career 

Smith attended West Virginia University, where he played for the West Virginia Mountaineers football team from 2009 to 2012. He was an English major during his time at West Virginia.

Freshman year 
Smith saw some action his freshman year as the backup behind senior Jarrett Brown. His first snap in a regular season game came against Auburn; he completed 5 of 8 passes for 50 yards and one interception. He would see action again against Syracuse, Marshall, Louisville, and in the Gator Bowl against Florida State. In his freshman year at West Virginia University, Smith completed 32 of 49 passes for 309 yards, throwing one touchdown and one interception, and rushing for seven yards on 17 attempts as the backup to starting quarterback Brown. He finished his freshman season with an 81.1 quarterback rating.

Sophomore year 
2010 was Smith's first year as the starting quarterback. For the year, he completed 241 of 372 passes for 2,763 yards, throwing 24 touchdowns and 7 interceptions, and rushing for 217 yards on 106 attempts.

He got his first start in the season opener against the Coastal Carolina Chanticleers. He completed 20 of 27 passes for 216 yards, two touchdowns, and one interception in the 31–0 victory.

With the Mountaineers down 21–6 against in-state rival, Marshall, Smith led his team to a 4th quarter comeback victory. Smith led the first drive from the Mountaineers' 4-yard line. With help from senior running back Noel Devine, the Mountaineers cut Marshall's lead to 8 points. After the Mountaineers' defense stopped Marshall, a punt put the Mountaineers near their own end zone again, starting from the 2-yard line. After completing 9 of 13 passes and scrambling for 20 yards, Smith found tight end Will Johnson in the corner of the endzone for a touchdown. With Marshall still leading 21–19, head coach Bill Stewart elected to go for the two-point conversion. Smith completed a pass to wide receiver Jock Sanders in the back of the end zone for a two-point conversion. The Mountaineers went on to win the game in overtime by a score of 24–21. Smith finished the game completing 32 of 45 passes for 316 yards and one touchdown. He rushed for 13 yards on 14 attempts. After two games, Smith lead the Big East in passing yards and passing efficiency.

In a 31–17 victory over Maryland, Smith completed 19 of 29 pass attempts for 268 passing yards and four touchdowns. Two of his touchdowns were to Tavon Austin, and two were to Stedman Bailey.  Smith won his first Big East Offensive Player of the Week for this performance.

In West Virginia's first meeting ever with LSU, the Mountaineers lost at Tiger Stadium by a score of 20–14. Smith completed 14 of 29 pass attempts for 119 yards, two touchdowns, and one interception. He rushed for 10 yards on five attempts.

Smith threw for 220 yards and ran for 19 yards in West Virginia's 49–10 win over UNLV. It was the most points WVU had scored since playing Connecticut in 2007.

In a 16–13 overtime loss to Connecticut, Smith was 22 for 34, throwing for 160 yards. He had a season high of 64 rushing yards. This was the first game all season Smith did not throw a touchdown pass. The loss was the first time Connecticut had ever beaten West Virginia.

Smith tied his record for touchdowns in a game in a 37–10 win over Cincinnati, where he was 15 for 25, throwing for 174 yards, four touchdowns, and one interception. The win came after a two-game losing streak. It was the first time the Mountaineers beat Cincinnati since 2007.  Smith won his second Big East Offensive Player of the Week for this performance.

On November 26, against Pittsburgh, he finished with 212 passing yards and three touchdowns in the 35–10 victory. In the next game against Rutgers, he had 352 passing yards and a touchdown in the 35–14 victory. He finished the 2010 season with 196 passing yards, one touchdown, and one interception in the 23–7 loss to North Carolina State in the Champs Sports Bowl.

Overall, in his sophomore season, Smith finished with 2,763 passing yards, 24 touchdowns, and seven interceptions.

Junior year 

With the arrival of new West Virginia football head coach Dana Holgorsen and a new passing-based offensive system, Smith saw his passing numbers improve drastically. In the fourth game of the season against the #2 LSU Tigers, Smith set school records for completions (38), attempts (65), and passing yards (463) in the 47–21 loss on September 24, 2011.

With 372 passing yards against the Cincinnati Bearcats on November 12, Smith tied a Big East record with his seventh 300-yard game of the season. He tied the record that was set in 2007 by Brian Brohm of the Louisville Cardinals.

He set single-season school records for pass completions (291), attempts (448), and yards (3,741) on November 25 in a win against the rival Pittsburgh Panthers. All three records were previously held by Marc Bulger.

In West Virginia's 70–33 rout of the Clemson Tigers in the 2012 Orange Bowl Smith tied three individual bowl records: most touchdown passes (six), most touchdowns overall (seven) and total points (42). Smith's 401 passing yards broke Tom Brady's Orange Bowl record of 396 that he set in the 2000 Orange Bowl. Smith also became the Big East single-season passing leader with 4,379 yards, breaking Brian Brohm's mark that he set in 2007.

Senior year 
As a senior, Smith put together multiple great statistical performances for the Mountaineers. In the season opening victory over Marshall, he finished 32-of-36 for 323 yards and four touchdowns. In the next game, a victory over James Madison, he finished 34-of-39 for 411 yards and five touchdowns. On September 29, against Baylor, he had a career-day going 45-of-51 for 656 yards and eight touchdown passes in the 70–63 victory. In the next game, a victory over Texas, he finished with 268 passing yards and four touchdowns to help lead the Mountaineers to a 5–0 record. After the win over Texas, the season started to falter for the Mountaineers. Despite some solid individual results, Smith and the Mountaineers dropped the next five games. On November 23, Smith had 236 passing yards and two touchdowns in a victory over Iowa State to stop the losing streak. In the regular season finale against Kansas, he finished 23-of-24 for 407 yards, three touchdowns, and one interception in the 59–10 victory. In the Pinstripe Bowl against Syracuse, he finished with 201 passing yards and two touchdowns in the 38–14 loss. Overall, in the 2012 season, Smith finished the season with 4,205 passing yards, 42 touchdowns, and 6 interceptions. After the season, Smith officially announced to enter the 2013 NFL Draft.

Awards and honors 
 All-Big East Conference Second-team (2010)
 All-Big East Conference First-team (2011)
 4× Big East Offensive Player of the Week
 2012 Orange Bowl Most Valuable Player
 3× Big 12 Offensive Player of the Week
 2× National Offensive Player of the Week (for week ending September 3, 2012; for week ending September 29, 2012)

College statistics

Professional career 
Smith received an invitation to the NFL Scouting Combine where his performance was well received by scouts who highlighted his athleticism and strong arm but noted his ball placement needed improvement. Smith was widely regarded as one of the top prospects alongside EJ Manuel of Florida State. In the days leading up to the draft, several NFL teams expressed interest in Smith including the Kansas City Chiefs (No. 1 selection), the Jacksonville Jaguars (No. 2 selection), the Oakland Raiders (No. 3 selection), the Philadelphia Eagles (No. 4 selection), the Buffalo Bills (No. 8 selection), and the New York Jets (No. 9 and No. 13 selections).

New York Jets

Draft and signing 
Smith was in attendance for the first round of the draft as many analysts and scouts expected him to be taken that night. However, he was not selected; EJ Manuel was the lone quarterback taken in the first round. Smith declined to be interviewed by ESPN afterwards and originally planned to return home but later decided to attend the second day of the draft. Several league executives alleged Smith did not handle the draft process in a professional manner which caused him to fall out of the first round while analysts pointed to his late-season decline as a senior at West Virginia, which exposed his flaws, as the primary reason. The following day, the Jets expressed interest in trading up in the second round to select Smith but couldn't consummate a trade. Despite this, Smith remained available and the Jets selected him as the 39th overall pick. General manager John Idzik, following the selection, stated Smith would compete with incumbent Mark Sanchez in training camp to determine the starting quarterback.

Smith fired his agency, Select Sports Group, upon the completion of the draft and sought new representation. He signed with Roc Nation Sports on May 22, 2013, with Kimberley Miale serving as his representative. Smith worked out in his home state of Florida during the offseason, prompting questions as to whether or not he had spurned Sanchez by not attending Sanchez's Jets West summer camp in California. Smith and Sanchez dismissed this notion with Sanchez saying that it was 'no big deal.' Smith signed a four-year, $5 million contract on July 22, 2013 with approximately $690,000 in workout bonuses.

2013 season: Rookie year 

Smith made his professional debut on August 9, 2013, in the first preseason game against the Detroit Lions. He completed 6-of-7 passes for 47 yards but left the game due to an ankle injury in the second quarter. X-rays showed no structural damage and Smith returned to practice on August 11. Smith started the Jets' third preseason game against the New York Giants completing 16 of 30 passes for 199 yards, a touchdown, and four turnovers. Smith was named the team's starting quarterback on September 4 after Sanchez suffered a shoulder injury against the Giants.

In his first regular season game against the Tampa Bay Buccaneers, Smith completed 24-of-38 passes for 256 yards and a touchdown. With only a few seconds left in the fourth quarter, Smith was hit out of bounds by Lavonte David, which drew a late hit penalty and the Jets went on to score the game-winning field goal. During Week 2 against the New England Patriots, Smith struggled as he completed 15 of his 35 passes for 214 yards, a touchdown and three interceptions, as the Jets lost 10–13. In Week 3 against the Buffalo Bills, Smith completed 16 of 29 passes for 331 yards, rushing for a touchdown and passing for two touchdowns and two interceptions. Despite 20 penalties, the Jets powered through and won 27–20. Smith became the first rookie quarterback in franchise history to throw for 300 or more yards in a game.

Smith struggled Week 4 against the Tennessee Titans. He completed 23 of his 34 passes for 289 yards and a touchdown while committing four turnovers—two led to Titans touchdowns as the Jets lost 13–38. The Jets faced the Atlanta Falcons on in Week 5; Smith completed 16 of his 20 passes for 199 yards and three touchdowns. He completed all four of his passes on the Jets' final drive, allowing Nick Folk to kick the game-winning 43-yard field goal. Smith was named AFC Offensive Player of the Week and the Pepsi NFL Rookie of the Week for his performance. In Week 6 against the Pittsburgh Steelers, Smith threw for 201 yards and two interceptions as the Jets lost, to the previously winless Steelers, 6–19. In Week 7, the Jets played the New England Patriots; Smith completed 17 of his 33 passes for 233 yards and scored two touchdowns as the Jets won 30–27 in overtime.

Smith struggled in the Jets' Week 8 9–49 loss against the Cincinnati Bengals as he completed 20-of-30 passes for 159 yards but threw two interceptions that were returned for touchdowns before being relieved of duties by Matt Simms in the fourth quarter. Smith started the following week against the New Orleans Saints; he completed 8 of his 19 passes for 115 yards and a rushing touchdown in a 26–20 upset of the Saints. The Jets returned from their bye week to lose three straight contests to the Bills, Ravens and Dolphins. Smith struggled during this stretch as he failed to score any points and committed eight turnovers; he was benched in favor of Simms against Buffalo and Miami leading coach Rex Ryan to be noncommittal in starting Smith the rest of the year.

Smith showed gradual improvement as the Jets won three of their final four games. Against the Raiders, Smith completed 16 of his 25 passes for 219 yards and scored twice in the Jets' 37–27 win that kept the team in playoff contention. The following week, the Jets played the Carolina Panthers. Smith performed well until throwing a costly pick six in the fourth quarter. The Jets lost 20–30 and were eliminated from playoff contention. Smith finished the game completing 15 of his 28 passes for 167 yards, a touchdown and interception. The Jets won their next contest against the Browns with Smith completing 20-of-36 passes for 214 yards and three touchdowns. In 20–7 win over the Miami Dolphins in his season finale, Smith completed 17-of-27 passes for 190 yards and a touchdown as the loss eliminated Miami from playoff contention. Smith completed his rookie season with 3,046 yards, 12 touchdowns, and 21 interceptions.

2014 season: Struggles and eventual benching 

Smith was named the starter for the 2014 season on August 22, 2014. Smith opened the season passing for 221 yards and throwing a touchdown and an interception in a 19–14 victory over the Oakland Raiders. During Week 2 against the Green Bay Packers, Smith passed for 176 yards and rushed for a touchdown but had an interception in the 24–31 loss.

During Week 3 against the Chicago Bears, Smith's very first play resulted in an interception returned for a touchdown by Ryan Mundy. Smith finished the game with 316 passing yards, a touchdown and 2 interceptions as the Jets lost to the Bears 19–27. During Week 4 against the Detroit Lions, Smith threw for 209 yards with an interception and a lost fumble during the 24–17 loss. On October 3, 2014, Smith was fined $12,000 for yelling profanity at fans while walking to the locker room during halftime in Week 4. Despite this incident, he was allowed to start in Week 5 against the San Diego Chargers, in which he threw for only 27 yards with an interception and was benched for the second half in favor of Michael Vick as the Jets were shut out 0–31. Prior to the Week 5 game, Smith missed a team meeting, eventually admitting that he went to a movie theater in San Diego, unaware that the eastern and pacific time zones had a three-hour difference. Smith started in Week 6 against the Denver Broncos, throwing for 190 yards, two touchdowns, and an interception in a 17–31 loss.

During Week 7 against the Patriots, Smith threw for 226 yards and the Jets combined for 218 rushing yards but an ensuing potential game-winning drive fell short due to a blocked field goal as the Jets lost 25–27. On October 26, Smith lasted only ten minutes to begin regulation as he went 2-of-8 with three interceptions against the Bills, and was subsequently benched in favor of Michael Vick. His passer rating for that game was 0.04.

On the final regular season game at Miami, Smith lead the Jets to a 37–24 victory. Smith passed for a career-high 358 yards, three touchdowns, and no interceptions, completing 20-of-25 attempts for a perfect passer rating. This was Smith's first perfect game, the sixth in Jets history, and the only one of the 2014 season. For the 2014 season, Smith finished the season with 2,525 passing yards, 13 touchdowns, and 13 interceptions in 14 games (13 starts).

2015 season: Preseason injuries 

On August 11, 2015, Smith was involved in an altercation with defensive end IK Enemkpali in the locker room over a $600 unpaid debt. Smith suffered a fractured jaw after Enemkpali punched him in the face. Smith was ruled out for 6–10 weeks, and Enemkpali was released by the Jets shortly thereafter. Two days later, Smith underwent surgery on his fractured jaw. Ryan Fitzpatrick led the team to a 2–0 record while Smith was injured, so new head coach Todd Bowles decided to continue starting Fitzpatrick, even with Smith being healthy.

On November 1, 2015, Smith entered the Jets' game against the Oakland Raiders in relief of Fitzpatrick, who left the game with an injured thumb. Smith threw 42 passing attempts, with 27 completions, two touchdowns, and one interception in the 20–34 loss. This was Smith's only appearance in a game in 2015.

2016 season: Torn ACL 

With Ryan Fitzpatrick re-signing with the Jets, Smith continued to remain in the backup role. 

During Week 6 against the Arizona Cardinals, Smith came in relief for Fitzpatrick for the first time in the 2016 season due to the Jets being down 3–28 and an unpleasant performance by Fitzpatrick during the first three quarters. Two days later, Smith was named starter for the following game in place of the struggling Fitzpatrick.

Making the start in Week 7 against the Baltimore Ravens, Smith had 95 passing yards until leaving the game with an apparent knee injury. Fitzpatrick would later lead the Jets to a 24–16 victory over the Ravens. The next day, it was revealed that Smith had a torn ACL, effectively ending his 2016 season. He was placed on injured reserve on October 26, 2016.

New York Giants 
On March 28, 2017, Smith signed with the New York Giants. On November 5, 2017, during Week 9 against the Los Angeles Rams, Smith came in the game in relief of Eli Manning late in the fourth quarter. Smith finished with only two incomplete passes, as the Giants lost 17–51.

On November 28, 2017, the Giants named Smith the starter for the upcoming game against the Oakland Raiders, which ended Manning's 210-game starting streak with the Giants. The start made Smith the first black quarterback to start for the Giants and the first quarterback to start for both the Giants and the Jets; it also meant every NFL team had started a black player at quarterback, with the Giants being the last team to do so. Making his first start with the Giants on December 3, 2017, against the Raiders, Smith finished with 212 passing yards and a touchdown but had two first-half fumbles within the Raiders' 30 yard line and the Giants lost, 17–24. On December 5, Manning was renamed the starter.

Los Angeles Chargers 
On April 1, 2018, Smith signed a one-year contract with the Los Angeles Chargers.

During Week 6, Smith made his first appearance with the Chargers, completing one pass for eight yards as the Chargers won 38–14 over the Cleveland Browns. Overall, Smith appeared in five games in the 2018 season in relief roles.

Seattle Seahawks 
Smith signed with the Seattle Seahawks on May 15, 2019.

2019 season 

Smith competed with Paxton Lynch for the backup job behind Russell Wilson. He was released on August 31, 2019, along with Lynch, but was re-signed the next day, earning the backup job. He did not see any game action during his first season with the team.

2020 season 

Smith re-signed with the Seahawks on May 20, 2020. His only appearance came in Week 14 blowout 40–3 win over his former team the New York Jets as he played out the final 16:26 of the game. He went 4 of 5 for 33 yards, leading the Seahawks to a field goal on the second of his two drives.

2021 season 

Smith re-signed with the team for a third season on April 22, 2021. He made his first appearance of the 2021 season in Week 5 against the Los Angeles Rams after Russell Wilson left the game with a finger injury. Smith finished with 131 passing yards, a touchdown (which was his first since 2017), and an interception as the Seahawks lost 17–26. Smith was announced the starter after Wilson was placed on injured reserve. Against the Pittsburgh Steelers in Week 6, Smith threw for 209 yards, a touchdown, but lost a fumble in overtime in the 20–23 loss. During Week 8, Smith led the Seahawks to a 31–7 victory over the Jacksonville Jaguars, where he threw for 195 yards and two touchdowns. Smith passed for 702 yards at a 68.4% completion rate, five touchdowns, one interception, and a 103.0 QB rating before Wilson's return in Week 10.

2022 season: Pro Bowler and Comeback Player of the Year 

The Seahawks re-signed Smith on April 19, 2022, but the NFL disapproved Smith's new contract that same day after conducting the league's mandatory review; the issue was eventually resolved.

On August 26, 2022, Smith was announced as the starting quarterback for the Seahawks' Week 1 matchup against the Denver Broncos, the team that former Seahawks quarterback Russell Wilson had been traded to during the offseason. Smith had competed for the starting quarterback spot with Drew Lock after the Seahawks traded Wilson.

In Week 1 against the Broncos, Smith completed 23 of 28 passes for 195 yards and two touchdowns as the Seahawks won 17–16. In Week 4, Smith threw for 320 yards and two touchdowns as well as 49 rushing yards and a rushing touchdown, leading the Seahawks to a 48–45 win over the Detroit Lions and winning NFC Offensive Player of the Week honors. In Week 8, Smith threw for 212 yards and two touchdowns as well as rushing for 26 yards, as the Seahawks won 27–13 over his former team, the New York Giants.

On December 21, 2022, Smith was selected to his first Pro Bowl. Against the New York Jets in Week 17, Smith completed 18 of 29 passes for 183 yards and two touchdowns in the 23–6 win, keeping the Seahawks alive in the playoff hunt and eliminating the team that drafted him in the process.

In a must-win game against the Los Angeles Rams, Smith completed 19 of 31 passes for 213 yards, one touchdown, and two interceptions in the 19–16 overtime win. During the game, Smith became the Seahawks’ single-season passing leader, surpassing Russell Wilson's mark of 4,219 yards set back in 2016. With the win and the Green Bay Packers' loss to the Detroit Lions later that night, the Seahawks clinched a playoff berth as the seventh seed, marking Smith's first playoff appearance.

Smith finished the regular season with numerous career highs, completing 399 of 572 passes. with a league-leading 69.8% completion percentage, for 4,282 yards, 30 touchdowns, 11 interceptions, and a 100.9 passer rating in 17 games. He was also the only quarterback to take every offensive snap for his team that season.

In Smith's first career postseason start, the Seahawks faced the San Francisco 49ers, where Smith completed 25 of 35 passes for 253 yards and two touchdowns, but lost a fumble and threw an interception as the Seahawks lost 41–23.

2023 season 
On March 6, 2023, Smith re-signed with the Seattle Seahawks on a three-year, $75 million deal.

NFL career statistics

Regular season

Postseason

Jets franchise records 
 Most passing yards in a single season by a rookie quarterback (2013): 3,046

Seahawks franchise records 
 Highest completion percentage in a single season: 69.8% (2022)
 Most passing yards in a season: 4,282 (2022)
 Most pass completions in a single season: 399 (2022)
 Most pass attempts in a single season: 572 (2022)

Personal life 
Smith is a Christian, frequently posting about his faith on his Twitter account.  He has been married to Hayley Eastham, whom he met in college, since 2015.

See also 
 List of NCAA major college football yearly passing leaders

References

External links 

 
 Seattle Seahawks bio
 West Virginia Mountaineers bio

1990 births
Living people
African-American players of American football
American Christians
American football quarterbacks
American people of Bahamian descent
Los Angeles Chargers players
Miramar High School alumni
National Conference Pro Bowl players
New York Giants players
New York Jets players
People from Miramar, Florida
Players of American football from Florida
Seattle Seahawks players
Sportspeople from Broward County, Florida
West Virginia Mountaineers football players